Philippe Lamberts (born 14 March 1963) is a Belgian politician serving as a Member of the European Parliament (MEP) since 2009. He is a member of Ecolo, within the Greens–European Free Alliance.

Education and early career
Lamberts graduated as an engineer at the University of Louvain (UCLouvain) in 1986. From 1987 to 2009 he worked at IBM in a variety of positions, also as a manager. Carrying out the function of councillor between 1994 and 2006, Lamberts represented the French-speaking Green Party Ecolo in the local council of Anderlecht. Between 1999 and 2003 he was an adviser of the Vice-Prime Minister Isabelle Durant on foreign affairs and defence.

Member of the European Parliament, 2009–present

Lamberts was the co-spokesperson of the European Green Party between 2006 and 2012. (first with Ulrike Lunacek, then with Monica Frassoni) and has been a Member of the European Parliament (MEP) for the Ecolo party since 2009. He has been leading the Greens–European Free Alliance in the European Parliament since 2014, alongside co-chair Rebecca Harms and later Ska Keller. He is a member of the European Parliament's Committee on Economic and Monetary Affairs (ECON) and the Committee on Industry, Research and Energy (ITRE).

As a member of ECON, Lamberts was credited with an amendment to the Fourth Capital Requirements Directive that capped bonus payments in the financial services to no more than 100% of their salary, or 200% with shareholder approval. In 2015, he led calls for a special committee of inquiry into how EU Member States give special tax treatment to “national champions;” he later became a member of the parliament's Special Committee on Tax Rulings and Other Measures Similar in Nature or Effect.

From 2017, Lamberts served on the Parliament's so-called Brexit Steering Group, which worked under the aegis of the Conference of Presidents and to coordinates Parliament's deliberations, considerations and resolutions on the UK's withdrawal from the EU. He is part of the European Internet Forum.

References

External links
 Philippe Lamberts' personal website
 Lamberts' official page on the European Parliament website.

1963 births
Living people
Ecolo MEPs
MEPs for Belgium 2009–2014
MEPs for Belgium 2014–2019
MEPs for Belgium 2019–2024